Chelsea Girl is the debut solo album and second studio album by German singer Nico. It was released in October 1967 by Verve Records and was recorded following Nico's collaboration with the Velvet Underground on their 1967 debut studio album. It was produced by Tom Wilson, who added string and flute arrangements against the wishes of Nico. The title is a reference to Andy Warhol's 1966 film Chelsea Girls, in which Nico starred.

Much of the album features instrumental work and songwriting credits from Velvet Underground members Lou Reed, Sterling Morrison, and John Cale. The song "I'll Keep It with Mine" was written by Bob Dylan, while three songs are by Jackson Browne, who contributes guitar.

Background
After collaborating as a singer with the Velvet Underground on their debut The Velvet Underground & Nico (recorded in 1966 and released in March of the following year), Warhol superstar Nico toured with the band in Andy Warhol's Exploding Plastic Inevitable (EPI) multimedia roadshow. Before the EPI came to an end in 1967, Nico took up residence in a New York City coffeehouse as a solo folk chanteuse; accompanied in turn by guitarists, such as Tim Hardin, Jackson Browne, and also her Velvet Underground bandmates Lou Reed, Sterling Morrison and John Cale.

Composition
Some of the accompanists wrote songs for Nico to sing, and these form the backbone of Chelsea Girl. Browne contributed "The Fairest of the Seasons", "These Days", and "Somewhere There's a Feather", while Hardin contributed "Eulogy to Lenny Bruce". "Wrap Your Troubles in Dreams" by Lou Reed was part of the earliest Velvet Underground repertoire (which did not surface as a Velvet Underground recording until it was included in the 1995 box set Peel Slowly and See), and Reed, Cale and Morrison in various combinations contributed four more songs. Additionally, Bob Dylan gave her one of his songs to record: "I'll Keep It with Mine".

Musically, Chelsea Girl can be described as a cross between chamber folk and 1960s baroque pop. The musical backing is relatively simple, consisting of one or two guitars or, alternatively, a keyboard instrument, played by either Browne or (a combination of) her Velvet Underground colleagues, but there are no drums or bass instruments, hence the absence of Velvets drummer Maureen Tucker, and adding to the chamber folk feel of the music are the string and flute overdubs added to the initial recordings by producer Tom Wilson and arranger Larry Fallon without involving or consulting Nico.

Legacy

In retrospective 21st-century reviews, AllMusic described the album as "an unqualified masterpiece", while Trouser Press commented that the album "is sabotaged by tepid arrangements and weak production" and is "of interest mainly for its links to the band Nico had just left."

Nico was dissatisfied with the finished product. Recalling the sessions in 1981, she stated:

In popular culture
Two tracks from the album – "The Fairest of the Seasons" and "These Days" – were used in Wes Anderson's 2001 film The Royal Tenenbaums. "The Fairest of the Seasons" was also used in Gus Van Sant's 2011 film Restless and Yuri Kanchiku's 2022 drama First Love. The song "Wrap Your Troubles in Dreams" was used in Andrew Dominik's 2012 film Killing Them Softly.

The Tallest Man on Earth recorded a version of "The Fairest of the Seasons" for his 2022 album of covers, Too Late for Edelweiss.

Track listing

Side A
 "The Fairest of the Seasons" (Jackson Browne, Gregory Copeland) – 4:06
 "These Days" (Jackson Browne) – 3:30
 "Little Sister" (John Cale, Lou Reed) – 4:22
 "Winter Song" (John Cale) – 3:17
 "It Was a Pleasure Then" (Lou Reed, John Cale, Nico) – 8:02

Side B
 "Chelsea Girls" (Lou Reed, Sterling Morrison) – 7:22
 "I'll Keep It with Mine" (Bob Dylan) – 3:17
 "Somewhere There's a Feather" (Jackson Browne) – 2:16
 "Wrap Your Troubles in Dreams" (Lou Reed) – 5:07
 "Eulogy to Lenny Bruce" (Tim Hardin) – 3:45

Personnel

Musicians
 Nico vocals
 Jackson Browne guitars (A1-2, B2-3, B5)
 Lou Reed electric guitar (A3, A5, B1, B4)
 John Cale viola, organ, guitar (A3-5)
 Sterling Morrison electric guitar (B1, B4)

Technical
 Tom Wilson producer
 Val Valentin director of engineering
 Gary Kellgren recording and remix engineer
 Larry Fallon string and flute arrangements
 Billy Name photography
 Paul Morrissey photography

References

External links
 Lyrics and liner notes

1967 debut albums
Albums arranged by Larry Fallon
Albums produced by Tom Wilson (record producer)
Folk rock albums by German artists
Nico albums
The Velvet Underground
Verve Records albums